Lydie Pace (born 1968) is a Central African singer.

References

External links
 Lydie Pace at maziki.fr

1968 births
Living people
Central African Republic musicians
African women singers
Sopranos
Date of birth missing (living people)